Sowczyce  is a village in the administrative district of Gmina Olesno, within Olesno County, Opole Voivodeship, in southern Poland.

The name of the village is of Polish origin and comes from the word sowa, which means "owl".

Transport
There is a train station in Sowczyce.

References

Villages in Olesno County